Cyperus marlothii is a species of sedge that is native to southern Africa.

The species was first formally described by the botanist Johann Otto Boeckeler in 1889.

See also 
 List of Cyperus species

References 

marlothii
Taxa named by Johann Otto Boeckeler
Plants described in 1889
Flora of Namibia
Flora of South Africa
Flora of Botswana